In algebraic geometry, given a linear algebraic group G over a field k, a distribution on it is a linear functional  satisfying some support condition. A convolution of distributions is again a distribution and thus they form the Hopf algebra on G, denoted by Dist(G), which contains the Lie algebra Lie(G) associated to G. Over a field of characteristic zero, Cartier's theorem says that Dist(G) is isomorphic to the universal enveloping algebra of the Lie algebra of G and thus the construction gives no new information.

Construction

The Lie algebra of a linear algebraic group 
Let k be an algebraically closed field and G a linear algebraic group (that is, affine algebraic group) over k. By definition, Lie(G) is the Lie algebra of all derivations of k[G] that commute with the left action of G. As in the Lie group case, it can be identified with the tangent space to G at the identity element.

Enveloping algebra 
There is the following general construction for a Hopf algebra. Let A be a Hopf algebra. The finite dual of A is the space of linear functionals on A with kernels containing left ideals of finite codimensions. Concretely, it can be viewed as the space of matrix coefficients.

The adjoint group of a Lie algebra

Distributions on an algebraic group

Definition 
Let X = Spec A be an affine scheme over a field k and let Ix be the kernel of the restriction map , the residue field of x. By definition, a distribution f supported at x'' is a k-linear functional on A such that  for some n. (Note: the definition is still valid if k is an arbitrary ring.)

Now, if G is an algebraic group over k, we let Dist(G) be the set of all distributions on G supported at the identity element (often just called distributions on G). If f, g are in it, we define the product of f and g, demoted by f * g, to be the linear functional

where Δ is the comultiplication that is the homomorphism induced by the multiplication . The multiplication turns out to be associative (use ) and thus Dist(G) is an associative algebra, as the set is closed under the muplication by the formula:
(*) 
It is also unital with the unity that is the linear functional , the Dirac's delta measure.

The Lie algebra Lie(G) sits inside Dist(G). Thus, a tangent vector amounts to a linear functional on I1 that has no constant term and kills the square of I1 and the formula (*) implies  is still a tangent vector.

Let  be the Lie algebra of G. Then, by the universal property, the inclusion  induces the algebra homomorphism:

When the base field k has characteristic zero, this homomorphism is an isomorphism.

Examples

Additive group 
Let  be the additive group; i.e., G(R) = R for any k-algebra R. As a variety G is the affine line; i.e., the coordinate ring is k[t] and I = (tn).

Multiplicative group 
Let  be the multiplicative group; i.e., G(R) = R* for any k-algebra R. The coordinate ring of G is k[t, t−1] (since G is really GL1(k).)

Correspondence 
 For any closed subgroups H, 'K of G, if k is perfect and H is irreducible, then

 Any action G on an affine algebraic variety X induces the representation of G on the coordinate ring k[G]. In particular, the conjugation action of G induces the action of G on k[G]. One can show I is stable under G and thus G acts on (k[G]/I)* and whence on its union Dist(G). The resulting action is called the adjoint action of G.

The case of finite algebraic groups 
Let G be an algebraic group that is "finite" as a group scheme; for example, any finite group may be viewed as a finite algebraic group. There is an equivalence of categories between the category of finite algebraic groups and the category of finite-dimensional cocommutative Hopf algebras given by mapping G to k[G]*, the dual of the coordinate ring of G. Note that Dist(G) is a (Hopf) subalgebra of k[G]*.

Relation to Lie group–Lie algebra correspondence

Notes

References 
 
 Milne, iAG: Algebraic Groups: An introduction to the theory of algebraic group schemes over fields
 Claudio Procesi, Lie groups: An approach through invariants and representations, Springer, Universitext 2006

Further reading 
 Linear algebraic groups and their Lie algebras by Daniel Miller Fall 2014

Algebraic geometry